Pstrążna  is a village in the administrative district of Gmina Lyski, within Rybnik County, Silesian Voivodeship, in southern Poland.

References

Villages in Rybnik County